Melplash is a village in western Dorset, England.

The construction of Christ Church between 1845 and 1846 was funded by James Bandinel (who was at one time secretary to William Wilberforce) in memory of his father, who had been vicar of Melplash and the neighbouring village of Netherbury.  The church was designed by Benjamin Ferrey and built in Neo-Norman style.

There was once a flax industry in the village. An annual agricultural show held in August by the name of The Melplash Agricultural Show started in the village in the 19th century but is now held on fields owned by the Melplash Agricultural Show Society at nearby West Bay.

References

External links

Villages in Dorset